This is a list of songs and artists that Jeff Lynne has produced.

Electric Light Orchestra

Out of the Blue 
All music and lyrics were written by Jeff Lynne. Orchestra and choral arrangements by Jeff Lynne, Richard Tandy and Louis Clark. Orchestra conducted by Louis Clark.

Included on original version 
 "Turn to Stone"
 "It's Over"
 "Sweet Talkin' Woman"  
 "Across the Border"
 "Night in the City"
 "Starlight"
 "Jungle"
 "Believe Me Now"
 "Steppin' Out"
 "Standin' in the Rain"
 "Big Wheels"
 "Summer and Lightning"
 "Mr. Blue Sky"
 "Sweet Is the Night"
 "The Whale"
 "Birmingham Blues" 
 "Wild West Hero"

2007 bonus tracks
 "The Quick and the Daft"
 "Latitude 88 North"

Discovery

Included on original version
"Shine a Little Love"
"Confusion"
"Need Her Love" 
"The Diary of Horace Wimp"
"Last Train to London"
"Midnight Blue" 
"On the Run" 
"Wishing" 
"Don't Bring Me Down"

2001 Bonus tracks
"On the Run" (Home Demo) 
"Second Time Around" (Home Demo) 
"Little Town Flirt"

All Songs Written by Jeff Lynne except the latter, written by Maron McKenzie and Del Shannon

George Harrison

Cloud Nine

Brainwashed 
All songs written by George Harrison, except track 10, written by Harold Arlen and Ted Koehler.

"Any Road"  
"P2 Vatican Blues (Last Saturday Night)"
"Pisces Fish" 
"Looking for My Life"
"Rising Sun" 
"Marwa Blues" 
"Stuck Inside a Cloud" 
"Run So Far" – 
"Never Get Over You" 
"Between the Devil and the Deep Blue Sea" 
"Rocking Chair in Hawaii"
"Brainwashed"

Includes a concluding prayer, the "Namah Parvati", chanted by Harrison and his son Dhani Harrison in unison.

Traveling Wilburys

Traveling Wilburys Vol. 1

Included on original version 
All songs written by the Traveling Wilburys ( Harrison, Lynne, Bob Dylan, Roy Orbison and Tom Petty).

"Handle with Care" 
"Dirty World" 
"Rattled" 
"Last Night" 
"Not Alone Any More"
"Congratulations" 
"Heading for the Light" 
"Margarita" 
"Tweeter and the Monkey Man" 
"End of the Line"

2007 bonus tracks 
"Maxine"
"Like a Ship"

Traveling Wilburys Vol. 3

Included on original version 
All songs written by the Traveling Wilburys.

"She's My Baby" 
"Inside Out" 
"If You Belonged To Me" 
"Devil's Been Busy" 
"7 Deadly Sins" 
"Poor House" 
"Where Were You Last Night?" 
"Cool Dry Place" 
"New Blue Moon" 
"You Took My Breath Away" 
"Wilbury Twist"

2007 Bonus tracks

Tom Petty

Full Moon Fever

Into the Great Wide Open

A Very Special Christmas 2
Christmas All Over Again

Highway Companion 
All songs written by Tom Petty, no exceptions.

Included on standard version 

"Saving Grace" 
"Square One" 
"Flirting with Time" 
"Down South"
"Jack" 
"Turn This Car Around" 
"Big Weekend"
"Night Driver" 
"Damaged by Love"
"This Old Town"
"Ankle Deep" 
"The Golden Rose"

Special Edition bonus tracks 
"Home"  
"Around the Roses" 
"Big Weekend" (demo version)
"This Old Town" (demo version)

Roy Orbison
 "You Got It"
 "A Love So Beautiful"
 "California Blue"
 "Heartbreak Radio"
 "I Drove All Night

The Beatles 

"Free as a Bird"
"Real Love"

Paul McCartney

Flaming Pie 
All songs written by Paul McCartney, except where noted.

The Song We Were Singing" 
"The World Tonight" 
"If You Wanna" 
"Somedays" 
"Young Boy" 
"Calico Skies" 
"Flaming Pie" 
"Heaven on a Sunday" 
"Used to Be Bad" (Steve Miller, McCartney)
"Souvenir" 
"Little Willow" 
"Really Love You" (McCartney, Richard Starkey)
"Beautiful Night"
"Great Day"

Julianna Raye

Something Peculiar 

All songs written by Julianna Raye, no exceptions.

"Limbo" 
"I'll Get You Back"
"Tell Me I'm Alright"
"Taking Steps"
"Peach Window"
"Something Peculiar"
"Roses"
"Laughing Wild"
"In My Time"
"My Tribe"
"Nicola"

Dave Edmunds

Information
"Slipping Away" (Jeff Lynne)
"Information" (Dave Edmunds, Mark Radice)

Riff Raff
"Something About You" (Lamont Dozier, Eddie Holland, Brian Holland)
"Breaking Out" (Jeff Lynne)
"Busted Loose" (Paul Brady)
"Far Away" (Jeff Lynne)
"S.O.S." (Jeff Lynne)
"Hang On" (Steve Gould)

See also 
 Jeff Lynne and The Beatles
 The Beatles reunions

External links 
elo.biz – Official ELO site
ftmusic.com - information for Electric Light Orchestra and related artists
Official George Harrison website
official website of Tom Petty
official Beatles site
official McCartney website 

Jeff Lynne
Lynne